The Asthma and Allergy Foundation of America (AAFA) is a non-profit organization dedicated to finding a cure for and controlling asthma, food allergies, nasal allergies and other allergic diseases.  AAFA's mission is also to educate the public about these diseases. AAFA's motto is "for life without limits" and AAFA represents the 70 million Americans with asthma and allergies.

History
AAFA was founded in 1953 to address the growing prevalence of asthma and allergic diseases in the United States. AAFA's activities include: (a) funding basic scientific research to help search for cures; (b) conducting public education to promote national awareness of these diseases; and (c) advocating public policies with a goal of improving the quality of life for patients.  AAFA has a network of state chapters throughout the United States.  AAFA also has a number of local support groups for asthma, food allergies and a variety of other specific allergic conditions.

AAFA is funded by contributions from the public, along with gifts and grants from foundations and government agencies as well as charitable donations from private sector groups. AAFA administers the Asthma & Allergy Friendly Certification Program in the U.S. in partnership with Allergy Standards Limited, sponsors Asthma and Allergy Awareness Month each May and also conducts research to identify the Asthma Capitals and the Allergy Capitals (spring and fall rankings), the most challenging places to live in the U.S. with asthma and allergies. AAFA has also developed a variety of asthma and allergy health education programs, that have been validated through formal research to help improve health outcomes for patients.

See also
 Food allergy in the United States

References

Further reading
 “Morbidity and Mortality Weekly Report,” CDC National Center for Health Statistics, February 24, 2006, 55(07);185
 “Morbidity and Mortality Weekly Report,” CDC National Center for Health Statistics, February 27, 2004, 53(07):145-8

External links
 

Allergy organizations
Asthma organizations
Health charities in the United States
Food allergy organizations
Medical and health organizations based in Maryland
Non-profit organizations based in Maryland
Organizations established in 1953
Voluntary health agencies of the United States